Shad Begum is a social worker from Dir Lower, Pakistan. She comes from a religious and middle class family. She is the first university-educated female in her family. She says, she always got support from her father, brothers and husband for her social work.

Association for Behaviour and Knowledge Transformation
Ms Shad founded the Association for Behaviour and Knowledge Transformation (ABKT) for the development of women in the area in 1994. Initially ABKT was known as Anjuman Behbood-i-Khawateen Talash. She faced many challenges and difficulties in the man dominated conservative society of the area. She shifted the organization office to Peshawar when the Taliban rose in the area and she was threatened by unidentified militants. The association has contributed in female education, political awareness and health improvement projects in the area. Furthermore, the association  has also carried out projects like construction of hanging bridges, installation of hand pumps, sinking wells, paving streets, provision of small loans to local traders and capacity building of women at grassroots level. The association gets funding from Pakistani and international agencies.

Awards
She was awarded with the International Women of Courage Award by the US First Lady Michelle Obama and the Secretary of State Hillary Clinton on Thursday 8 March 2012. The area where she comes from is very conservative and there are very few working women. She had requested several news reporters not to spread the news because of security reasons.

References

1974 births
Living people
Pakistani social workers
People from Lower Dir District
Pashtun people
Pashtun women
Recipients of the International Women of Courage Award